Alan Wynne-Thomas, born in 1941 in Carmarthen, Wales and died on 28 September 2008, is a British offshore sailor and navigator. He crossed the Atlantic eleven times, three of them solo.

Biography
After graduating from the London School of Economics, he set up his own successful company specializing in health software. He plays rugby, successively in the clubs of Maesteg, Saracens F.C. and Otago.

In 1992, he took part in the English Transat, which he finished in third place in the category of monohulls and seventh in the general classification. That same year, he competed in the second edition of the 1992–1993 Vendée Globe aboard his yacht Cardiff Discovery. Between the Kerguelen Islands and Heard Island, his boat capsized, but righted itself, he fells and thinks he has broken his ribs. He gives up and slows down in Hobart, where an X-ray will reveal that six of his ribs are actually broken.

Personal life
He married first time with Margaret with whom he had two sons Rhian and Rhidian. He then marries Jill who gives him two daughters Ellen and Isla. He died of cancer at the age of 67.

References

1941 births
2008 deaths
British male sailors (sport)
Sportspeople from Carmarthen
Alumni of the London School of Economics
Saracens F.C. players
Maesteg RFC players
Otago rugby union players
IMOCA 60 class sailors
British Vendee Globe sailors
1992 Vendee Globe sailors